Wisting is a Norwegian thriller police procedural television series starring Sven Nordin as widower William Wisting, a senior police detective, and in the first five episodes, co-starring Carrie-Anne Moss as FBI Special Agent Maggie Griffin.

Wisting is the most expensive television drama series produced in Norway. Its first season is based on two Jørn Lier Horst novels, The Caveman (2013) and The Hunting Dogs (2012). In episodes 1–5, Wisting heads a murder investigation with FBI collaboration since the suspect is a serial killer hunted in the US. In episodes 6-10, Wisting has to defend himself against accusations of tampering with evidence in a previous murder case. In late 2020, the show was renewed for a second season. Four episodes, based on the novel The Inner Darkness (2019), were aired in Scandinavia as Season 2 starting 26 December 2021, with a third season of similar length already confirmed; those eight episodes were originally intended to all be included in Season 2. This four-episode third season, based on The Night Man (2009), screened in Scandinavia in April 2022.

Plot

Season 1 (2019)
A man's body is found, hidden in the snow, under a tree on a Christmas tree farm near Larvik, Norway. This is investigated by William Wisting and his team of detectives. Fingerprints link the death to Robert Godwin, an American serial killer who has been on the run for more than 20 years. He is believed to have fled to Larvik, "hiding in plain sight", having assumed the identity of a local resident. In response the FBI sends Special Agents Maggie Griffin and John Bantham to assist the Norwegian investigation. But they must keep their presence secret to avoid alerting the killer, who they fear will flee again. Wisting's daughter, Line, is a journalist writing a story about their next-door neighbour, who had died alone in his house. Unwittingly, her investigating opens up connections with the police murder investigation and she becomes a target. Line's liaison with Bantham, allowing her to discover his identity, compromises his cover. Meanwhile, the police discover the killer's principal dumpsite, the body count sharply rises and the hunt moves over the border into Sweden before Wisting and Griffin corner the killer in a dramatic climax.

Wisting appears on a national television show to discuss the Robert Godwin case. Instead he is ambushed by Philip Henden, a lawyer representing Vidar Haglund, who was jailed for 17 years in a different murder case. Now released, Haglund has always maintained his innocence. The crucial DNA evidence, placing him at the crime scene, is shown to have been tampered with, so Wisting is suspended while the investigation is carried out. Line Wisting is outraged that her father is being hounded by the newspaper for which she works and resolves to clear his name, but a murder case she is working on starts to become connected to everything else.

Season 2 (2021)
A race against time to hunt down an escaped killer before he can strike again, with serious consequences for Wisting's team.

Season 3 (2022)
The head of a girl is found placed on a spike in Larvik's town square, shocking the nation. When another dead body is pulled from the river, it becomes clear that the case may delve into broad international criminal connections.

Cast 
 Sven Nordin as William Wisting, police detective
 Carrie-Anne Moss as Maggie Griffin, FBI Special Agent
 Thea Green Lundberg as Line, Wisting's daughter, journalist
 Jonas Strand Gravli as Thomas, Wisting's son
 Kjersti Sandal as Torunn Borg, Wisting's deputy
 Mads Ousdal as Nils Hammer, police detective
 Mariann Hole as Sissel
 Lars Berge as Benjamin Fjeld, police detective

Season 1
 Richie Campbell as John Bantham, FBI Special Agent
 Ulrikke Hansen Døvigen as Christine Thiis, police prosecutor
 Irina Eidsvold Tøien as Andrea Vetti, police chief
 Gard B. Eidsvold as Frank Robekk, retired police detective
 Fridtjov Såheim as Philip Henden, lawyer
 Christoffer Staib as Vidar Haglund, hunted murderer
 Lasse Vermeli as Erik, press photographer
 Jon Øigarden as Terje Nordbo, Chief Inspector, Independent Office for Police Conduct

Production 
Wisting'''s first season is based on two books by Jørn Lier Horst, The Caveman (2013) and The Hunting Dogs (2012). Horst is a best-selling author in Norway and has been translated into over 30 languages. Filming started in January 2018 on a 150-day schedule. The adaptation was written by Trygve Allister Diesen and Kathrine Valen Zeiner. Diesen also directed episodes along with Katarina Launing.

The show's first season had a budget of NOK 110 million (€11.4 million). This sum incorporated a €1 million grant from Creative Europe as well as a grant of NOK 26.05 million (€2.7 million) from the Norwegian Film Institute. This makes the show the most expensive drama ever produced in Norway.

 Release 
The Norway and Sweden broadcast commenced in April 2019. In the US, the series was launched on December 18, 2019 via the Sundance Now streaming service. In the United Kingdom, the series was acquired by BBC Four from Banijay Rights and commenced broadcast on 28 December 2019, with two episodes being shown back-to-back for five weeks.

 Reception 
The Nordic press viewed the series favourably. Stavanger Aftenblad commented that it was "intricate and riveting", Jyllands-Posten called it "a sure winner" and Aftenposten praised its "nonstop momentum".

Writing in The Wall Street Journal, Dorothy Rabinowitz found the series "seamlessly woven" and "superbly layered".

Writing in UK's The Guardian'', Euan Ferguson described the series as "... the best Nord-noir ever. Since the last one. What did Scandinavian film-makers think they were ever doing, 80 years of existential angst and Death playing nihilist chess, before remembering: we have crime. Coal. Snow. Blood. Fire. Cheekbones. Let’s do that."

References

External links 
 
 

Television shows set in Norway
2019 Norwegian television series debuts
2010s Norwegian television series
Norwegian crime television series